Camp Benson Falls is a 90-foot waterfall on Summit Creek in Lindsey Creek State Park, Hood River County, Oregon, United States.

References
Waterfalls Northwest

Waterfalls of Hood River County, Oregon
Waterfalls of Oregon